Peter Andrew Comensoli (born 25 March 1964) is an Australian Catholic prelate who was named the ninth Archbishop of Melbourne on 29 June 2018. 

He had been serving as the third Bishop of Broken Bay in New South Wales since December 2014. From 2011 to 2014 he was an auxiliary bishop of the Archdiocese of Sydney.

Early life 
Comensoli studied at St Paul's (now Holy Spirit) College, Bellambi, New South Wales, and studied commerce at the University of Wollongong while working for four years in the banking sector before switching to theology.

Priesthood
Comensoli entered St Patrick's Seminary in 1986 and obtained a Bachelor of Theology (BTh) degree in 1989 and a Bachelor of Sacred Theology (STB) degree in 1991 from the Catholic Institute of Sydney. He was ordained a priest of the Diocese of Wollongong in 1992 by William Edward Murray. Comensoli obtained a Licentiate of Sacred Theology (STL) from the Alphonsian Academy in Rome in 2000, a Master of Letters (MLitt) degree in moral philosophy from the University of St Andrews in 2007 and a Doctor of Philosophy (PhD) degree in theological ethics from the University of Edinburgh. His doctoral thesis was titled "Recognising persons: the profoundly impaired and Christian anthropology" and was submitted in 2012.

Episcopacy 
Comensoli was appointed an auxiliary bishop of the Archdiocese of Sydney and titular bishop of Tigisis in Numidia by Pope Benedict XVI on 20 April 2011. He was consecrated as a bishop by Cardinal George Pell at St Mary's Cathedral in Sydney on 8 June 2011, becoming Australia's youngest Catholic bishop.

On 27 February 2014, Comensoli was appointed by Pope Francis as apostolic administrator of the Archdiocese of Sydney following Cardinal Pell's appointment as prefect of the newly formed Secretariat for the Economy. On 18 September 2014, Pope Francis appointed Anthony Fisher the new Archbishop of Sydney, and Comensoli remained the apostolic administrator until Fisher's installation on 12 November.

On 20 November 2014, Pope Francis appointed Comensoli as the Bishop of Broken Bay. His installation took place on 12 December.

On 29 June 2018, Comensoli was appointed Archbishop of Melbourne. He was installed on 1 August.

Comensoli personally vouched for Cardinal Pell by signing a letter of support in 2015 ahead of the Royal Commission into Institutional Child Sexual Abuse, describing him as a "man of integrity", and considered him a personal friend.

Comensoli has stated that he would not break the seal of confession for confessions which include admissions of sexual abuse.

References

External links 

 
 

1964 births
Living people
University of Wollongong alumni
Alumni of the University of St Andrews
Alumni of the University of Edinburgh
Alphonsian Academy alumni
Australian people of Italian descent
Bishops appointed by Pope Benedict XVI
Roman Catholic bishops of Broken Bay
Roman Catholic moral theologians
Roman Catholic archbishops of Melbourne
Roman Catholic bishops of Sydney
Australian Roman Catholic archbishops